Cecilioides nyctelia is a species of very small air-breathing land snail, a terrestrial pulmonate gastropod mollusk in the family Ferussaciidae.

Distribution
This species is endemic to Madeira, Portugal.

References

Ferussaciidae
Endemic fauna of Madeira
Taxonomy articles created by Polbot